The Bantu Education Act 1953 (Act No. 47 of 1953; later renamed the Black Education Act, 1953) was a South African segregation law that legislated for several aspects of the apartheid system. Its major provision enforced racially-separated educational facilities. Even universities were made "tribal", and all but three missionary schools chose to close down when the government would no longer help to support their schools. Very few authorities continued using their own finances to support education for native Africans. In 1959, that type of education was extended to "non-white" universities and colleges with the Extension of University Education Act, and the University College of Fort Hare was taken over by the government and degraded to being part of the Bantu education system. It is often argued that the policy of Bantu (African) education was aimed to direct black or non-white youth to the unskilled labour market although Hendrik Verwoerd, the Minister of Native Affairs, claimed that the aim was to solve South Africa's "ethnic problems" by creating complementary economic and political units for different ethnic groups.

The ruling National Party viewed education as having a rather pivotal position in their goal of eventually separating South Africa from the Bantustans entirely. Verwoerd, the "Architect of Apartheid", stated:
"There is no place for [the Bantu] in the European community above the level of certain forms of labour.... What is the use of teaching the Bantu child mathematics when it cannot use it in practice?"

The Act led to a substantial increase of government funding to the learning institutions of black Africans, but they did not keep up with the population increase. The law forced institutions to be under the direct control of the state. The National Party now had the power to employ and train teachers as it saw fit.

Black teachers' salaries in 1953 were extremely low and resulted in a dramatic drop of trainee teachers. Only one third of the black teachers were qualified.

The schools reserved for the country's white children were of Western standards. The Act did not stipulate lesser standards of education for non-whites, but it legislated for the establishment of an advisory board and directed the minister to do so. Of the black schools, 30% of had no electricity, 25% had no running water and more than half had no plumbing. Education for Blacks, Indians and Coloureds was substantially cheaper but not free, and the salaries of teachers were set at very low levels.

In the 1970s, the per capita governmental spending on black education was one-tenth of the spending on white.

In 1976, the Afrikaans Medium Decree of 1974, which forced all black schools to use both Afrikaans and English as languages of instruction from the last year of primary school, led to the Soweto Uprising in which more than 575 people died, at least 134 of them under the age of 18.

The Act was repealed in 1979 by the Education and the Training Act of 1979, which continued the system of racially-segregated education but also eliminating both discrimination in tuition fees and the segregated Department of Bantu Education and allowed both the use of native tongue education until the fourth grade and a limited attendance at private schools as well.

Segregation became unconstitutional after the introduction of the Interim Constitution in 1994, and most sections of the Education and Training Act were repealed by the South African Schools Act, 1996. The Bantu education Act created a separate inferior education system for black students. The purpose of this act was to make sure that black South Africans would only ever be able to work as unskilled and semi-skilled labourers, even if they were intelligent enough to become skilled. This kept them the servants to white South Africans.

References 

 
http://nmmu.ac.za/documents/mward/Bantu%20Education%20Act%201953.pdf

External links 
 Article on apartheid and education that mentions the Bantu Act (in Dutch)
 "Bantu Education Act, Act No 47 of 1953", South African History Online.

1953 in international relations
1953 in South African law
Apartheid laws in South Africa
Education law